Al-Zahiriyya al-Tahta was a Palestinian Arab village in the Safad Subdistrict. Possibly named after the Mamluk sultan al-Zahir Baybars, the village was incorporated into the Safad Sanjak of the Ottoman Empire in 1517, and its entirely Muslim population paid fixed taxes, as well as taxes on winter pastures, an olive oil or grape syrup press and beehives during the 16th century. By the late 19th century, the population grew to 335 inhabitants, all Muslims. The population remained about the same in the last years of British Mandatory rule. The village lands spanned 6,773 dunums, nearly half of which were used to grow grains, the residents living on 28 dunums. Al-Zahiriyya al-Tahta was depopulated during the 1948 Palestine War when its inhabitants fled shortly after the capture of Safed by Jewish paramilitary forces.

Name
According to Edward Henry Palmer the name Edh Dhaheriyeh et Tahta means "The lower village on the ridge", while according to Walid Khalidi, the name Zahiriyya might be a tribute to  the Mamluk Sultan al-Zahir Baybars.

History

Ottoman era
Incorporated into the Ottoman Empire in 1517 with the rest of Palestine; in the 1596 tax registers al-Zahiriyya al-Tahta belonged to the nahiya (subdistrict) of Jira in the Safad Sanjak. It had an all Muslim population, consisting of 56 households; an estimated population of 308. The villagers paid most of its taxes as a fixed sum of 6,000 akçe. In addition they paid taxes on goats and beehives, winter pastures, occasional revenues, and a press for olive oil or grape syrup; a total 6,336 akçe. Part of the revenues went to a waqf (religious endowment).

The village appeared under the name of Elzalarieh on the map that Pierre Jacotin compiled during Napoleon's invasion of 1799, while in 1838 it was noted as a village in the Safad district. In 1881 the PEF's Survey of Western Palestine described al-Zahiriyya al-Tahta: "This village is built of good stone materials, at the foot of a hill, with olives and arable land around. It is inhabited by about 100 Moslems, and has two good springs close to the village." A population list from about 1887 referred to the village as Kiryet ed Daheriyeh, and counted 335 Muslim inhabitants.

British Mandate era

In the 1922 census of Palestine conducted by the British Mandate authorities, al-Zahiriyya al-Tahta had a population of 212 Muslims, increasing slightly in the 1931 census to 256 Muslims, in a total of 53 houses. In the 1945 statistics, al-Zahiriyya al-Tahta had a population of 350, all Muslims, and a land area of 6,773 dunams. Of this, 810 dunams were plantations and irrigable land, 3,042 were used for grain, while 28 dunams were classified as built-up, or urban area. The children in the village went to school in Safad.

1948 war and aftermath
The inhabitants of al-Zahiriyya al-Tahta fled the village in the aftermath of Safed's capture by the Jewish paramilitary forces of the Palmach and the Haganah and the subsequent exodus of Safed's Arab population in early May 1948, during the 1947–1948 civil war in Mandatory Palestine.

In 1992 the village site was described: "The entire topography of the place has been altered, as Safad's expansion has taken over the site. A street that is part of the urban neighborhood crosses the site and leads to a recently-built cluster of houses. However, the stone debris from demolished houses can be identified, along with iron supports that protrude from the ruined cement walls. The cemetery is visible, though dilapidated. An olive grove and almond trees grow on the edge of the site."

In 2003 a memorial book about the village was published in Jordan.

References

Bibliography

 
 
 
  (pp. 327, 391) 
 
 
 

  
 (p.591)

External links
Welcome To al-Zahiriyya al-Tahta
al-Zahiriyya al-Tahta, Zochrot
Maqam sheikh Kuweiyis
 al-Zahiriyya al-Tahta Dr. Khalil Rizk. 
Survey of Western Palestine, Map 4: IAA, Wikimedia commons
al-Zahiriyya al-Tahta, from the Khalil Sakakini Cultural Center

Arab villages depopulated during the 1948 Arab–Israeli War
District of Safad